Wooden chest syndrome is a rigidity of the chest following the administration of high doses of opioids during anaesthesia.

Wooden chest syndrome describes marked muscle rigidity — especially involving the thoracic and abdominal muscles — that is an occasional adverse effect associated with the intravenous administration of lipophilic synthetic opioids such as fentanyl. It can make ventilation difficult, and seems to be reversed by naloxone. Hypoxemia, hypertension, pulmonary hypertension, respiratory acidosis and increased intracranial pressure may supervene.

One recent study hypothesized that chest wall rigidity might be at least partially responsible for some deaths related to intravenous injection of fentanyl, which increasingly is appearing in samples of heroin.

References

Effects of external causes
Anesthesia
Fentanyl